Kalamazoo County is a county located in the U.S. state of Michigan. , the population was 261,670. The county seat is Kalamazoo.

Kalamazoo County is included in the Kalamazoo–Portage, MI Metropolitan Statistical Area.

History
Kalamazoo County was organized in 1830, although its set off date is unknown.  The village of Kalamazoo (then known as Bronson) was made the county seat in 1831.

The name purportedly means "the mirage or reflecting river" and the original Indian name was "Kikalamazoo".  See, Etymology of Kalamazoo for detail on the origin of the name.  See also, List of Michigan county name etymologies.

Kalamazoo County does not have a county flag.

Geography

Geographic features
 Kalamazoo River
 Portage River

Adjacent counties

 Barry County - northeast
 Allegan County - northwest
 Calhoun County - east
 Van Buren County - west
 Branch County - southeast
 St. Joseph County - south
 Cass County - southwest

Transportation

Air service
 The Kalamazoo & Battle Creek Metro Area is served by Kalamazoo/Battle Creek International Airport.

Highways
  runs north–south through the west-central part of the county.
  connects northern Kalamazoo to US 131.
It runs eastward through Oshtemo Township and turns north at U.S. 131.
  enters the county near the midpoint of the northern county line.
  starts on the northeast side of Kalamazoo and runs along Gull Road to Richland.

Demographics

As of the 2010 United States Census, there were 250,331 people living in the county. 80.1% were non-Hispanic White, 11.1% Black or African American, 2.2% Asian, 0.5% Native American, and 3.0% of two or more races. 4.0% were Hispanic or Latino (of any race).

As of the 2000 United States Census, there were 238,603 people, 93,479 households, and 57,956 families living in the county. There were 99,250 housing units at an average density of 177 per square mile (68/km2). The racial makeup of the county was 84.57% White, 9.73% Black or African American, 0.41% Native American, 1.83% Asian, 0.03% Pacific Islander, 1.27% from other races, and 2.15% from two or more races.  2.64% of the population were Hispanic or Latino of any race. 18.3% were of German, 11.5% Dutch, 10.3% English, 8.4% Irish and 7.2% American ancestry according to Census 2000. 93.7% spoke English and 2.8% Spanish as their first language.

There were 93,479 households, out of which 30.40% had children under the age of 18 living with them, 47.70% were married couples living together, 11.00% had a female householder with no husband present, and 38.00% were non-families. 28.00% of all households were made up of individuals, and 8.50% had someone living alone who was 65 years of age or older.  The average household size was 2.43 and the average family size was 3.00.

The county population contained 24.10% under the age of 18, 15.20% from 18 to 24, 28.20% from 25 to 44, 21.10% from 45 to 64, and 11.40% who were 65 years of age or older.  The median age was 33 years. For every 100 females, there were 93.60 males.  For every 100 females age 18 and over, there were 90.50 males.

The median income for a household in the county was $42,022, and the median income for a family was $53,953. Males had a median income of $39,611 versus $27,965 for females. The per capita income for the county was $21,739.  About 6.50% of families and 12.00% of the population were below the poverty line, including 12.30% of those under age 18 and 6.30% of those age 65 or over.

Government
Kalamazoo County was a bastion of the Republican Party following the Civil War. From 1884 through 1988, voters selected the Republican Party presidential nominee all but three times–in 1912, 1936 and 1964. However, starting in 1992 the county has voted Democratic in every presidential election (through 2020). It swung particularly heavily to the Democrats after 2008, following the trend in most urban counties across the country. Even as Michigan trended Republican in 2016, Kalamazoo County voted for Democratic candidate to a similar level as in recent years. 

The county government operates the jail, provides law enforcement in unincorporated areas, maintains rural roads, operates the major local courts, keeps files of deeds and mortgages, maintains vital records, administers public health regulations, and participates with the state in the provision of welfare and other social services. The county board of commissioners controls the budget but has only limited authority to make laws or ordinances.  In Michigan, most local government functions—fire, building and zoning, tax assessment, street maintenance, etc.—are the responsibility of individual cities and townships.

Elected officials

 Prosecuting Attorney: Jeffrey S. Getting (Democrat)
 Sheriff: Richard Fuller (Democrat)
 County Clerk/Register of Deeds: Meredith Place (Democrat)
 County Treasurer: Thomas L. Whitener (Democrat)
 Drain Commissioner: Jason Wiersma (Democrat)
 County Surveyor: Gary D. Hahn (Republican) 
 County Commissioner for District 1: Tami Rey (Democrat)
 County Commissioner for District 2: Monteze Morales (Democrat)
 County Commissioner for District 3: Tracy hall (Democrat)
 County Commissioner for District 4: Jen Strebs (Democrat)
 County Commissioner for District 5: Veronica McKissack (Democrat)
 County Commissioner for District 6: Jeff Heppler (Republican)
 County Commissioner for District 7: Roger Tuinier (Republican)
 County Commissioner for District 8: John H. Gisler (Republican)
 County Commissioner for District 9: Dale Shugars (Republican)
 County Commissioner for District 10: Mike Quinn (Democrat)
 County Commissioner for District 11: Fran Bruder Melgar (Democrat)
 Eighth District Court: Judges Tiffany A. Ankley, Christopher Haenicke, Kathleen Hemingway, Alisa L. Parker-LaGrone, Richard A. Santoni, Ronald Schafer, Namita Sharma, and Vincent C. Westra (all non-partisan)
 Ninth Circuit Court: Judges Curtis J. Bell, Paul J. Bridenstine, Gary C. Giguere Jr., Stephen G. Gorsalitz, Pamela L. Lightvoet, Alexander C. Lipsey, Namita Sharma, and Scott Pierangeli (all non-partisan).

(information current )

Communities

Cities

 Galesburg
 Kalamazoo (county seat) (called Bronson until 1836)
 Parchment
 Portage

Villages

 Augusta
 Climax
 Richland
 Schoolcraft
 Vicksburg

Census-designated places

 Comstock Northwest
 Eastwood
  Greater Galesburg (before 2010)
 South Gull Lake
 Westwood

Other unincorporated communities

 Adams Park
 Burdick Settlement (1833)
 Comstock
 Cooper Center
 East Comstock
 Fulton
 Lawndale
 Gull Lake
 Midland Park
 Milwood
 Scotts
 Shirland (proposed 1831)
 Yorkville

Townships

 Alamo Township
 Brady Township
 Charleston Township
 Climax Township
 Comstock Charter Township
 Cooper Charter Township
 Kalamazoo Charter Township
 Oshtemo Charter Township
 Pavilion Township
 Prairie Ronde Township
 Richland Township
 Ross Township
 Schoolcraft Township
 Texas Charter Township
 Wakeshma Township

See also
 List of Michigan State Historic Sites in Kalamazoo County, Michigan
 National Register of Historic Places listings in Kalamazoo County, Michigan

References

External links

 Kalamazoo County Government
 

 
Michigan counties
Kalamazoo–Portage metropolitan area
1830 establishments in Michigan Territory
Populated places established in 1830